Catherine Fabienne Dorléac (born 22 October 1943), known professionally as Catherine Deneuve, is a French actress as well as an occasional singer, model, and producer, considered one of the greatest European actresses. She gained recognition for her portrayal of icy, aloof, and mysterious beauties for various directors, including Jacques Demy, Luis Buñuel, François Truffaut, and Roman Polanski. In 1985, she succeeded Mireille Mathieu as the official face of Marianne, France's national symbol of liberty. A 14-time César Award nominee, she won for her performances in Truffaut's The Last Metro (1980), for which she also won the David di Donatello for Best Foreign Actress, and Régis Wargnier's Indochine (1992).

Deneuve made her film debut in 1957 at the age of 13, in a film shot the year earlier when she was only 12. She first came to prominence in Jacques Demy's 1964 musical The Umbrellas of Cherbourg. She went on to star for Polanski in Repulsion (1965), and for Buñuel in Belle de Jour (1967) and Tristana (1970). She was nominated for the BAFTA Award for Best Actress for Belle de Jour, and the Academy Award for Best Actress for Indochine. She also won the 1998 Volpi Cup for Best Actress at the Venice Film Festival for Place Vendôme. Her English-language films include The April Fools (1969), Hustle (1975), The Hunger (1983), Dancer in the Dark (2000), and The Musketeer (2001). Other notable films include Mississippi Mermaid (1969), Scene of the Crime (1986), My Favourite Season (1993), 8 Women (2002), Persepolis (2007), Potiche (2010), The Brand New Testament (2015), and Bonne Pomme (2017). More recent films include The Midwife (2017), The Truth (2019), and Peaceful (2021).

Early life
Deneuve was born Catherine Fabienne Dorléac in Paris, the daughter of French stage actors Maurice Dorléac (1901–1979) and Renée Simonot (1911–2021). Deneuve has two sisters, Françoise Dorléac (1942–1967) and Sylvie Dorléac (born 14 December 1946), as well as a maternal half-sister, Danielle, whom their mother had out of wedlock in 1937 with Aimé Clariond, but who was later adopted by Maurice and took his surname. Deneuve used her mother's maiden name, which she chose for her stage name, in order to differentiate herself from her sisters. Deneuve attended Catholic schools.

Film career
Deneuve made her film debut with a small role in André Hunebelle's Les Collégiennes (1957) with her younger sister Sylvie Dorléac who, like their older half-sister Danielle, was an occasional child actress. She subsequently appeared in several films for director Roger Vadim as well as in L'Homme à femmes (1960), which caught the eye of Jacques Demy, who cast Deneuve in his romantic film musical
Les Parapluies de Cherbourg (1964), the film that brought her to stardom. Deneuve played the cold but erotic persona, for which she would be nicknamed the "ice maiden", in Roman Polanski's horror classic Repulsion (1965), reinforcing it in Luis Buñuel's Belle de Jour (1967), and reaching a peak in Tristana (1970). Her work for Buñuel would be her best known.

Further films from early in her career included Jean-Paul Rappeneau's A Matter of Resistance (1966), Demy's musical Les Demoiselles de Rochefort (1967) (opposite her sister Françoise Dorléac), and François Truffaut's romantic thriller Mississippi Mermaid (1969). Deneuve limited her appearances in American films of the period to The April Fools (1969), a romantic comedy with Jack Lemmon, and Hustle (1975), a crime drama with Burt Reynolds. Her starring roles at the time were featured in such films as A Slightly Pregnant Man (1973) with Marcello Mastroianni and Le Sauvage (1975) with Yves Montand.

In the 1980s, Deneuve's films included François Truffaut's Le Dernier métro (1980), for which she won the César Award for Best Actress, and Tony Scott's The Hunger (1983) as a bisexual vampire, co-starring with David Bowie and Susan Sarandon, a role which brought her a significant lesbian following, mostly among the gothic subculture. She made her debut film as a producer in 1988, Drôle d'endroit pour une rencontre, alongside frequent co-star Gérard Depardieu.

In the early 1990s, Deneuve's more significant roles included 1992's Indochine opposite Vincent Perez, for which she was nominated for an Academy Award for Best Actress and won a second César Award for Best Actress; and André Téchiné's two movies, Ma saison préférée (1993) and Les Voleurs (1996). In 1997, Deneuve was the protagonist in the music video for the song N'Oubliez Jamais sung by Joe Cocker. In 1998 she won acclaim and the Volpi Cup at the Venice Film Festival for her performance in Place Vendôme. In the late 1990s, Deneuve continued to appear in a large number of films such as 1999's five films Est-Ouest, Le temps retrouvé, Pola X, Belle maman, and Le Vent de la nuit.

Deneuve's part in Lars von Trier's musical drama Dancer in the Dark (2000), alongside Icelandic singer Björk was subject to considerable critical scrutiny. The film was selected for the Palme d'Or at the Cannes Film Festival. She made another foray into Hollywood the following year, starring in The Musketeer (2001) for Peter Hyams. In 2002, she shared the Silver Bear Award for Best Ensemble Cast at the Berlin International Film Festival for her performance in 8 Women. In 2005, Deneuve published her diary A l'ombre de moi-meme ("In My Own Shadow", published in English as Close Up and Personal: The Private Diaries of Catherine Deneuve); in it she writes about her experiences shooting the films Indochine and Dancer in the Dark. She also provided the voice role of Marjane Satrapi's mother in Satrapi's animated autobiographical film Persepolis (2007), based on the graphic novel of the same name. Her 100th film appearance was in Un conte de Noël released in 2008.

Deneuve's later work includes Potiche (2010) with frequent co-star Depardieu, Beloved (2011), alongside former co-stars Ludivine Sagnier and Chiara Mastroianni, the popular French adventure comedy Asterix and Obelix: God Save Britannia (2012) with Gérard Depardieu and Valérie Lemercier, screenwriter and director Emmanuelle Bercot's On My Way (2013), Palme D'or winning writer/director Pierre Salvadori's comedy drama In the Courtyard (2014), and André Téchiné's drama In the Name of My Daughter (2014). She co-starred alongside Catherine Frot, in writer/director Martin Provost's French drama The Midwife (2017).

Career outside film

Modeling

Deneuve appeared nude in two Playboy pictorials in 1963 and 1965. Her image was used to represent Marianne, the national symbol of France, from 1985 to 1989. As the face of Chanel No. 5 in the late 1970s, she caused sales of the perfume to soar in the United Statesso much so that the American press, captivated by her charm, nominated her as the world's most elegant woman. In 1983, American Home Products retained her to represent their cosmetics line and hired world-renowned photographer Richard Avedon to promote its line of Youth Garde cosmetics, for which she famously proclaimed, "Look closely. Next year, I will be 40."

She is considered the muse of designer Yves Saint Laurent; he dressed her in the films Belle de Jour, La Chamade, La sirène du , Un flic, Liza, and The Hunger. In 1992, she became a model for his skincare line.
In 2001, she was chosen as the new face of L'Oréal Paris. In 2006, Deneuve became the third inspiration for the M•A•C Beauty Icon series and collaborated on the colour collection that became available at M•A•C locations worldwide in February that year. Deneuve began appearing in the new Louis Vuitton luggage advertisements in 2007. Deneuve was listed as one of the fifty best-dressed over 50s by the Guardian in March 2013. In July 2017, Deneuve appeared in a video campaign for Louis Vuitton entitled Connected Journeys, celebrating the launch of the brand's Tambour Horizon smartwatch, which also featured celebrities, including Jennifer Connelly, Bae Doona, Jaden Smith and Miranda Kerr.

Entrepreneurial
In 1986, Deneuve introduced her own perfume, Deneuve. She is also a designer of glasses, shoes, jewelry and greeting cards.

Charities
 Deneuve was appointed UNESCO Goodwill Ambassador for the Safeguarding of Film Heritage in 1994 until her resignation on 12 November 2003.
 Deneuve asked that the rights owed to her from her representation of Marianne be given to Amnesty International.
 Louis Vuitton made a donation to The Climate Project, spearheaded by Al Gore, on behalf of Deneuve.
 Deneuve is also involved with Children Action, Children of Africa, Orphelins Roumains and Reporters Without Borders.
 Douleur sans frontiers (Pain Without Borders) – At the end of 2003, Deneuve recorded a radio commercial to encourage donations to fight against the pain in the world, notably for the victims of landmines.
 Handicap International – In the middle of July 2005, Deneuve lent her voice to the message of radio commercials, TV and cinema, which denounced the use of the BASM (cluster bombs).
 Voix de femmes pour la démocratie (Voice of women for democracy) – Deneuve read the text, "Le petit garçon", of Jean-Lou Dabadie, on the entitled CD, "Voix de femmes pour la démocratie." The CD was sold for the benefit of the female victims of the war and the fundamentalisms that fight for democracy.
 Deneuve has also been involved with various charities in the fight against AIDS and cancer.

Political involvement

 In 1971, Deneuve signed the Manifesto of the 343. The manifesto was an admission by its signers to have had illegal abortions, and therefore exposed themselves to judicial actions and prison sentences. It was published in Le Nouvel Observateur on 5 April 1971. That same year, feminist lawyer Gisèle Halimi founded the group, Choisir ("To Choose"), to protect the women who had signed the Manifesto of the 343.
 Deneuve is involved with Amnesty International's program to abolish the death penalty.
 In 2001, Deneuve delivered a petition organized by the French-based group, "Together Against the death penalty", to the U.S. Embassy in Paris.
 In April 2007, Deneuve signed a petition on the internet protesting against the "misogynous" treatment of socialist presidential candidate Ségolène Royal. More than 8,000 French men and women signed the petition, including French actress Jeanne Moreau.
In 2011, among other French celebrities Deneuve signed a petition asking the future President of France to propose a vote at the United Nations General Assembly to decriminalize homosexuality worldwide.
 In January 2018, Deneuve, along with 99 other French women writers, performers and academics, signed an open letter that argued the #Me Too movement had gone too far, turning into a "witch hunt", and denounced it as a form of puritanism, resulting in a backlash. Although she later apologized to all the victims who might have felt assaulted by the letter, she still supported it saying there was "nothing in the letter" to Le Monde that said "anything good about harassment, otherwise I wouldn't have signed it".

Personal life
Besides her native French, Deneuve speaks fluent Italian and English and has some knowledge of Spanish, though she does not fluently speak the language. Her hobbies and passions include gardening, drawing, photography, reading, music, cinema, fashion, antiques and decoration. According to a 1996 article published by The New York Times, Deneuve is a practising Roman Catholic.

Deneuve has been married once: to photographer David Bailey from 1965 to 1972, though they separated in 1967. She has lived with director Roger Vadim, actor Marcello Mastroianni, cinematographer Hugh Johnson, and Canal+ tycoon Pierre Lescure.

Deneuve has two children: actor Christian Vadim (born 18 June 1963), from her relationship with Roger Vadim, and actress Chiara Mastroianni (born 28 May 1972), from her relationship with Marcello Mastroianni. She has five grandchildren.

Deneuve has not had a public relationship since her breakup with Lescure in 1991. They remain friends, and Deneuve's children consider him their stepfather. According to Gala, in late 2019 Deneuve relied on Lescure while she recuperated from a stroke, and in 2020, Lescure told Paris Match that they still talk to each other every day.

Throughout her 20s and 30s, Deneuve reportedly dated actors Sami Frey, Clint Eastwood, Franco Nero, Burt Reynolds, and John Travolta as well as directors Roman Polanski, Jerry Schatzberg, François Truffaut and Milos Forman, talent agent Bertrand de Labbey, singer Serge Gainsbourg and TV host Carlos Lozano. While most of her confirmed liaisons have been with much older men, Lozano was 19 years her junior, and in his late teens when he and Deneuve were involved in the early 1980s.

In recent decades, Deneuve's lack of a boyfriend of record – in combination with the fact she's kissed women in five films – has prompted speculation about her sexual orientation, which she acknowledged in a 2002 interview with Knack magazine: "Now that people know nothing about my private life, they start guessing: is there still a man in her life and who is he then? When they see me two or three times with a female friend they say: we've always known that." Reports from 2000 claimed her beau was a 25-year-old technician she'd met on a recent film, but no writers could identify him. In 2006, Deneuve told The Daily Telegraph that she was in a relationship, but would not disclose the name of her partner.

Deneuve is close friends with the artist Nall and owns some of his works.

On 6 November 2019, BBC News reported that Deneuve suffered a mild stroke and was recuperating in a Paris hospital. Despite the health scare, there was no damage to her motor functions. Five weeks later, she was released from the hospital and spent the remainder of 2019 recuperating at her Paris home.

A 2020 biography of Johnny Hallyday by Gilles Lhote claims that the singer maintained a carefully hidden, 56-year affair with Deneuve that started when they were teenagers in 1961 and continued until Hallyday's death in 2017.

Deneuve began smoking in 1960 at age 16, and was known to smoke up to three packs a day. She quit in 1985 with the aid of hypnotherapy, but started again in 1996. In 2020, French actress and recent co-star Juliette Binoche told Vanity Fair that Deneuve has stopped smoking since her stroke.

Filmography

Discography
 1980:
 Dieu fumeur de havanes – by and with Serge Gainsbourg (original film soundtrack Je vous aime by Claude Berri)
 Quand on s'aime – duet with Gérard Depardieu, for a television programme
 1981: Her first and only album issued – Souviens-toi de m'oublier written by Serge Gainsbourg
 Digital delay
 Depression au-dessus du jardin
 Epsilon
 Monna Vanna et Miss Duncan
 Marine bond tremolo
 Ces petits riens (duet with Serge Gainsbourg) – original version performed by Gainsbourg and Juliette Gréco (1964)
 Souviens-toi de m'oublier (duet with Serge Gainsbourg)
 Overseas telegram
 What tu dis qu'est-ce tu say
 Oh Soliman
 Alice helas
 1993: Paris Paris – by and with Malcolm McLaren
 1997: Allo maman bobo – by Alain Souchon, during an evening with Les Enfoirés in 1997 with Alain Souchon, Jean-Jacques Goldman and Laurent Voulzy
 1999: Joyeux anniversaire maman – by Stomy Bugsy (original film soundtrack Belle-maman by Gabriel Aghion)
 2000: Cvalda – by and with Björk (included in Selmasongs, the soundtrack for Dancer in the dark by Lars von Trier)
 2001: Toi jamais – original film soundtrack Huit Femmes by François Ozon (original version performed by Sylvie Vartan en 1976)
 2006: Ho capito che ti amo – original film soundtrack Le héros de la famille by Thierry Klifa
 2010: C'est beau la vie by Jean Ferrat – original film soundtrack Potiche by François Ozon
 2011: Tout est si calme with Clara Couste, Ludivine Sagnier and Chiara Mastroianni, Une fille légère in duet with Chiara Mastroianni, Je ne peux vivre sans t'aimer – original film soundtrack Beloved by Christophe Honoré
 Audiobooks for Éditions des Femmes:
 Cendrillon by Charles Perrault
 Bonjour tristesse by Françoise Sagan
 Les Petits Chevaux de Tarquinia by Marguerite Duras
 Les Paradis aveugles by Duong Thu Huong
 La Marquise d'O by Heinrich von Kleist
 Lettres à un jeune poète by Rainer Maria Rilke
 Letters Home by Sylvia Plath

Awards and nominations

Academy Awards

BAFTA Awards

César Awards

Other awards

In 2000, a Golden Palm Star on the Palm Springs, California, Walk of Stars was dedicated to her. In 2013, she was honored for her lifetime achievement at the 26th European Film Awards. In 2015, she received the Lifetime Achievement Golden Orange Award from International Antalya Film Festival, Turkey. In 2020, The New York Times ranked her number 21 in its list of the 25 Greatest Actors of the 21st Century.

See also
 Cinema of France
 History of cinema

References

Notes

Citations

External links

 
 
 Catherine Deneuve at filmsdefrance.com
 
 
 Catherine Deneuve interview (21 September 2005)

Living people
1943 births
20th-century French actresses
21st-century French actresses
Best Actress César Award winners
David di Donatello winners
Honorary Golden Bear recipients
Dorléac family
European Film Award for Best Actress winners
French activists
French women activists
French people of Norman descent
French Roman Catholics
French film actresses
Actresses from Paris
French humanitarians
Women humanitarians
French television actresses
French anti–death penalty activists
Recipients of the Order of Agricultural Merit
Volpi Cup for Best Actress winners
Audiobook narrators
Signatories of the 1971 Manifesto of the 343